Nemanja Nikolić (born 1 January 1988) is a Montenegrin professional  footballer who plays as a midfielder for Serbian club Kolubara.

Club career
Born in Valjevo, Nikolić began playing in the youth teams of Red Star Belgrade. His debut as a senior happened in 2006 when he played on loan with Zlatibor Voda in the Serbian League Vojvodina. In the following season, he moved to Montenegro where he represented Grbalj in the Montenegrin First League.

In the summer of 2008, Nikolić returned and joined the first team of Red Star Belgrade, making his debut in the 2008–09 Serbian SuperLiga season. After playing two seasons with Red Star, in the summer of 2010, he was sent a loan to another SuperLiga side, Spartak Subotica. At the end of the season, he left Red Star and joined OFK Beograd.

After OFK Beograd, Nikolić played in the Belarusian Premier League with Dinamo Minsk and BATE Borisov and later on Minsk. He also played for Israeli Premier League clubs Hapoel Tel Aviv and Hapoel Ra'anana and Serbian SuperLiga club Voždovac on two occasions.

On 30 July 2020, Nikolić signed a two-year contract with Bosnian Premier League club Tuzla City. He made his official debut for the club in a league game against Olimpik on 23 August 2020. Nikolić left Tuzla City in January 2021, after terminating his contract with the club.

International career
Nikolić represented the Montenegrin U21 national team, before debuting for the senior team in 2009. He made his senior debut for Montenegro in an August 2009 friendly match against Wales and has earned a total of 12 caps, scoring no goals. His final international was an October 2016 FIFA World Cup qualification match against Kazakhstan.

Honours
Red Star Belgrade
Serbian Cup: 2009–10

BATE Borisov
Belarusian Premier League: 2015

References

External links

Nemanja Nikolić Stats at Utakmica.rs

1988 births
Living people
Sportspeople from Valjevo
Montenegrin people of Serbian descent
Montenegrin footballers
Association football midfielders
Red Star Belgrade footballers
OFK Grbalj players
FK Spartak Subotica players
OFK Beograd players
FC Dinamo Minsk players
FC BATE Borisov players
Hapoel Tel Aviv F.C. players
FK Voždovac players
Hapoel Ra'anana A.F.C. players
FC Minsk players
FK Tuzla City players
RFK Grafičar Beograd players
FK Kolubara players
Montenegrin First League players
Serbian SuperLiga players
Belarusian Premier League players
Israeli Premier League players
Premier League of Bosnia and Herzegovina players
Montenegro under-21 international footballers
Montenegro international footballers
Montenegrin expatriate footballers
Montenegrin expatriate sportspeople in Belarus
Montenegrin expatriate sportspeople in Israel
Montenegrin expatriate sportspeople in Bosnia and Herzegovina
Expatriate footballers in Belarus
Expatriate footballers in Israel
Expatriate footballers in Bosnia and Herzegovina